Fredrick Ogechi Okwara (born 19 March 1989) is a Nigerian professional footballer who last played as a midfielder for Adanaspor in the TFF First League.

References

1989 births
Living people
Nigerian footballers
Nigerian expatriate footballers
Adanaspor footballers
Expatriate footballers in Turkey
Association football midfielders